Iceland competed at the 2022 Winter Paralympics in Beijing, China which took place between 4–13 March 2022. Alpine skier Hilmar Snær Örvarsson competed in two events. He previously represented Iceland at the 2018 Winter Paralympics held in Pyeongchang, South Korea.

Competitors
The following is the list of number of competitors participating at the Games per sport/discipline.

Alpine skiing 

One alpine skier represented Iceland.

See also
Iceland at the Paralympics
Iceland at the 2022 Winter Olympics

References

Nations at the 2022 Winter Paralympics
2022
Winter Paralympics